The Calabrian dialect of Greek is the variety of Italiot Greek used by the ethnic Griko people in Calabria, as opposed to the Italiot Greek dialect spoken in the Grecìa Salentina. Both are remnants of the Ancient and Byzantine Greek colonization of the region.

Calabrian Greek is mentioned in the Red Book of UNESCO on endangered languages, together with Griko. In addition, Euromosaic analyses and recognizes it as being an endangered and minority language in the European Union. It is mentioned by Ethnologue as a dialect of Modern Greek in the sense of a modern vernacular language of the Hellenic family (as is the case with Pontic and Tsakonian Greek).

History

The use of Calabrian Greek can trace its roots to the ancient colonies of Magna Grecia, and possibly earlier. Calabria was once a territory of the Byzantine empire from 536 AD until it was conquered by the Normans in 1071 AD. During Byzantine rule the territory was referred to as the Catepanate of Italy.

Calabrian Greek was spoken throughout the whole of south Calabria until the 15th to 16th century, when it was gradually replaced by a Romance dialect (Calabrian), but there are influences of Calabrian Greek on the grammar and in a large part of the latter's vocabulary. During the Angevin Age (1266–1435) the Greek dialect was widely spoken in a large area between Seminara, Taurianova, the Mésima's valley and the plateau of Poro. A brief historical analysis illustrates quite readily the progressive disappearance of the Greek dialect in different Calabrian areas from the 16th century onwards.

Around the mid-16th century, it had disappeared from the fields of Petrace, particularly from the high valley of Diverso and Tasi. During the 17th century the regression spread to some valleys in the western side of Aspromonte near the Straits of Messina, such as the Catona and Gallico Valleys. During the 19th century, it was lost in some villages like Pentedattilo, Africo, Brancaleone, Motta San Giovanni, Montebello, and San Lorenzo, on the Ionic side of Aspromonte; and in the early 20th century, that spread to the towns of Palizzi, Staiti, Cardeto, Roccaforte del Greco, Amendolea and Condofuri.

During the fascist period in Italy, linguistic minorities were strongly discouraged from using their mother tongues, which affected the use of Calabrian Greek.

Distribution
Today, Calabrian Greek is spoken in nine towns of Bovesìa including Bova Superiore, Roghudi, Gallicianò, Chorìo di Roghudi, Bova Marina, and the city of Reggio di Calabria, especially in the neighborhoods of San Giorgio Extra and Rione Modena.

Several hundred Griko people continue to speak the Calabrian-Greek dialect in the Arangea and Sbarre neighbourhoods of Reggio Calabria and another small number has been reported in Melito di Porto Salvo, mainly from migration from Roghudi and from Chorìo after the severe floods that occurred there in 1971.

About 2,000 Griko people now speak and understand the language, but only about 50 of them are under the age of thirty-five, despite the efforts of cultural associations and administrative agencies to reinvigorate the language.

In Bova, many people now learn Modern Greek rather than Calabrian Greek.

Characteristics
Calabrian Greek has much in common with Modern Standard Greek. With respect to its origins, some philologists assert that it is derived from Koine Greek by Medieval Greek, but others assert that it comes directly from Ancient Greek and particularly from the Doric Greek spoken in Magna Graecia, with an independent evolution uninfluenced by Koine Greek.

The evidence is based on archaisms in this language, including the presence of words from Doric Greek but no longer used in Greece (except in Tsakonian). There are also quite a few distinctive characteristics in comparison with Standard Modern Greek.

For example, in many cases, the final "-s" in most words has been lost (i.e. gaidaros (donkey) becomes gadaro in Calabrian Greek). Moreover, a future tense does not exist in this dialect; it is replaced by the present tense.

Speakers write the language using the Latin alphabet, not the Greek alphabet. The Greek consonants θ and χ are spelled th and ch as in traditional Latin renderings, k is used for κ, and j represents /j/. Phonologically, it resembles the surrounding local Italian languages more than standard Greek, while maintaining a largely Hellenic vocabulary; for example, geminated consonants are found in Griko, and δ, γ remain /d/, /g/ as in Italian rather than being spirantized as in standard Greek or Spanish, and stressed vowels are spelled with the grave accent as in Italian dictionaries.

Literature
The literature is scarce and consists of books of poetry, local history or calendars, frequently in three languages (Italian, Calabrian Greek and Modern Greek).

In the absence of a linguistic authority, in the late 1970s, the association Jalò tu Vúa initiated a research group to set up methodological standards to teach Calabrian Greek and draft a grammar for the schools. The commune of Bova published it as pamphlet in 1979 with the title La Glossa di Bova (Bova's dialect).

Role in humanism
Calabrians were well represented in Humanism and in the Renaissance. Indeed, the Greek scholars of that period frequently came from Calabria, maybe because of the influence of spoken Greek. The rediscovery of Ancient Greek in Western Christianity was very difficult because this language had been almost forgotten. The presence of Calabrian humanists as well as refugees from Constantinople was essential.

The study of Ancient Greek was mainly a work of two monks of the monastery of Seminara: Barlaam, bishop of Gerace, and his disciple, Leonzio Pilato.

Leonzio Pilato, in particular, was an ethnic Greek Calabrian born near Reggio Calabria. He was an important teacher of Ancient Greek and translator, and he helped Giovanni Boccaccio in the translations of Homer's works.

Music
Calabrian Greek has never had a broad tradition in music, but there are a number of local folk groups that sing in this dialect.

An annual festival called "Palea riza" ("Ancient Root" in both Calabrian and Standard Greek) of world and Calabrian Greek music is held in Bova and other picturesque towns of the area.

Current status

Cultural associations
Inspired by the efforts of Rohlfs, a group of university students looked to further increase the exposure of this dialect by publishing a pamphlet entitled . This was the first organised activity aimed at protecting the language.

In 1970, the group established a cultural association named  and the pamphlet became a magazine, which contained poetry and prose in both Italian and in Greek Calabrian.

Mass media
There are two periodicals in Calabrian Greek: I Riza, which is trilingual (Italian, Calabrian Greek and Modern Greek) and published by the Jalò tu Vúa association, and CUMELCA. The former is a four-monthly publication, and the latter is supposed to be published every three months but is irregular. The region gives some financial aid to support the publications.

No radio stations broadcast in Calabrian Greek, mostly because of the crisis of the local private radio stations. Between 1977 and 1984, coinciding with the boom in local stations, some stations aired programs in this language. Among them were the Radio Antenna Don Bosco at Bova Marina, Radio San Paolo at Reggio di Calabria and RTM at Mélito di Porto Salvo. The dialect has never been used on television.

Education and raising awareness
The Greek government in Athens, by the Associazione Internazionale degli Ellenofoni (SFEE) or the International Association of Greek-speakers, has established relations with La Ionica and has officially invited Calabrian Greeks at the annual meetings they host in Greece. Apart from that, La Ionica has not been well supported by government public institutions; awareness of this problem has really surfaced in only the last few years.

The region of Calabria has encouraged the education of the dialect in schools, along with what already happens regarding Albanian, thus promoting bilingualism. In 1993, the region also created an Istituto Regionale Superiore di Studi Ellenofoni (Regional Institute of Advanced Hellenophonic Studies), based in Bova Marina.

Despite the initial activity, the program has not made many advances because of the lack of qualified teachers and the fact that bilingualism is not present in administration. The improvements are very small and at the moment, for example, only the towns of Bova and Bova Marina have bilingual street signs.

The gradual decline in the use of Greek Calabrian is mainly from the population viewing it as nothing more than a dialect, a form of expression of the lower classes that is typical of rural and/or illiterate peoples. The lack of linguistic registers (use in environments other than at a familiar level) is a further impediment to its survival.

The language was preserved while the population remained isolated in the mountains of the Aspromonte. Following the migrations from the zones of the bulk of the population, the younger generations of today have only a very basic knowledge of the language. Also, improved education standards encourage the use of other languages, such as Italian, even on a day-to-day basis.

Activity in the area of education, even if it is supported by local administration and legislation in promoting the presence of Greek in the classroom and in universities, is limited because lecturers and tutors with an adequate knowledge of Greek Calabrian are not available to offer courses. Initial activity has been limited to the initiatives of cultural groups at a local level, with the financial support of the odd local council.

The teaching of the language in schools has not followed a bilingual format but has been offered more as an optional subject at primary school level, thanks to the financial support of the regional government and the European Community. Student numbers have remained quite low.

The teaching of the language is completely absent at the secondary school level. Still, the cultural associations offer courses aimed at adults.

Thus, the biggest problem remains the limited knowledge of the language on the part of the teaching fraternity for which bilingualism is not a mandatory element of their qualification. Some further education of such graduates is offered by the odd cultural association such as Jalò tu Vúa but only by the support of the European Community. That association has even worked towards the creation of a Greek Calabrian grammar.

See also
 Griko dialect
 Griko people
 Magna Graecia

References

External links
 Leonzio Pilato's Biography
Rindinedda, traditional Griko song

Varieties of Modern Greek
Languages of Calabria
Magna Graecia
Greece–Italy relations
Endangered Indo-European languages